"Paloma Blanca" (Spanish for "white dove"), often called "Una Paloma Blanca", is a song written by Dutch musician George Baker (under his real name, Johannes Bouwens) and first recorded and released by his band, George Baker Selection. The single—the title track of the group's fifth album—was released in 1975 with "Dreamboat" (or "Dream Boat") as its B-side. The song was a hit throughout Europe, reaching  1 in Austria, Finland, Flanders, Germany, the Netherlands, Sweden and Switzerland, and it also topped the charts of New Zealand and South Africa.

In the United States, the song became a No. 1 hit on the Billboard Easy Listening Singles chart on 14 February 1976 (becoming that chart's overall No. 1 song for 1976), peaked at No. 26 on the Billboard Hot 100, and reached No. 33 on the Billboard Hot Country Singles chart. In Canada and the United Kingdom, "Paloma Blanca" peaked at No. 10, and in Australia, it reached No. 2. The song sold over two million copies worldwide.

Meaning
Baker has been quoted as saying the song is about "a poor South American farmer who works hard all day and then sits by a tree and dreams of being a white bird with its freedom."

Charts

Weekly charts

Year-end charts

Cover versions

Following the George Baker Selection's success, the song was widely covered. In the UK, where the group took "Paloma Blanca" to a No. 10 chart peak, the recording by Jonathan King achieved No. 5. King's version was also a hit in Ireland, although its No. 15 Irish chart peak was topped there by a cover from the Dixies (with Rory O'Connor), who took the song to No. 11.

In South Africa, an Afrikaans rendering of "Paloma Blanca" entitled "My klein wit duifie" was a hit for a studio group credited as Tameletjie, its chart peak being No. 9.

A German-language rendering of "Paloma Blanca" was a hit for Nina & Mike (de) in both Germany (No. 6) and Austria (No. 7).

In Scandinavia, translated renderings of "Paloma Blanca" were hits for Siw Malmkvist (No. 8 in Sweden) and Hans Petter Hansen (no) (No. 7 in Norway), an alternate Swedish rendering being recorded by Säwes (sv). A Danish version was recorded by Bjørn Tidmand.

In Finland, a localized translation of "Paloma Blanca" was a No. 2 hit for Katri Helena, besting a rival version by Kisu (fi) at No. 18. Finland also afforded chart status to the Jonathan King version "Una Paloma Blanca" which peaked at No. 27 there. The Finnish-language rendering of "Paloma Blanca" has been recorded by Aaron (fi), Jukka Kuoppamäki, and Matti ja Teppo.

Patricia Lavila (fr) recorded both French and Italian renderings of "Paloma Blanca", the former reaching No. 39 on the French chart.

French singer Georgie Dann recorded a version in Spanish, released in 1975 in Spain as the B-side of "Campesino".

Other versions were by Demis Roussos and Slim Whitman. Bobby Vinton recorded a version that appeared on his 1976 album Serenades of Love.

The song is often parodied, given its popularity and middle-of-the-road quality. In 1976, the British Scrumpy and Western group The Wurzels had a No. 3 UK hit with their parody of the song, "I Am a Cider Drinker", which was covered in 2003 by North London ska band Bad Manners, for their album Stupidity, and in 2011 by Scottish pirate metal band Alestorm as a bonus track for their album Back Through Time. A remake by The Wurzels themselves was released in 2007 with a video. A similarly titled parody, "We Are the Shumba Drinkers", by Mike Westcott and Leprechaun, gained popularity in Afrikaaner and White Rhodesian communities.

George Baker re-recorded a solo version of the song in 2005, for the film Too Fat Too Furious; the song had earlier been used in the 1982 film The Executioner's Song. In 2011, it was given a rap make-over on the song-exchange-programme Ali B op volle toeren; George Baker returned the favour by performing a rewritten version of rapper Dio's "Tijdmachine".

See also
List of number-one hits of 1975 (Germany)
List of number-one singles (Sweden)
List of number-one adult contemporary singles of 1976 (U.S.)

References

1975 songs
1975 singles
1976 singles
Dutch Top 40 number-one singles
George Baker Selection songs
Jonathan King songs
Number-one singles in Austria
Number-one singles in Finland
Number-one singles in Germany
Number-one singles in New Zealand
Number-one singles in Norway
Number-one singles in South Africa
Number-one singles in Sweden
Number-one singles in Switzerland
Schlager songs
Songs about birds
Songs written by George Baker (Dutch singer)
Ultratop 50 Singles (Flanders) number-one singles
UK Records singles
Warner Records singles